"No Dogs on Diamond Street" is the fifth television play episode of the first season of the Australian anthology television series Australian Playhouse. "No Dogs on Diamond Street" was written by Marion Ord and directed by Storry Walton and originally aired on ABC on 16 May 1966

Plot
A watchman is murdered at Norm Hutton's place of work. He relies on his daughter Patti to provide an alibi.

Cast
 Ed Devereaux as Norm Hutton
 Helen Morse as Patty Hutton
 Margaret Christensen
 Beverley Kirk
 Don Reid

Production
It was written by Marion Ord, who lived in a property near Parkes. In 1965 she attended at TV school at Orange held by the University of Sydney Adult Education Department, and started writing Do Dogs as an exercise for the course.

It was made by the same team who had produced a TV version of My Brother Jack including star Ed Devereaux, designer Jack Montgomery and producer Storry Walton.

Reception
The Sunday The Sydney Morning Herald called it "flimsy and amateurishly constructed at times but balanced by exceptionally fine acting performances from Ed (My Brother Jack) Devereux, Margaret Christensen and Helen Morse. "

The Sydney Morning Herald praised Helen Morse and said "the other actors were all full capable of making the characters live, but the ragged effect of both dialogue and events in the story were against them."

The Age said it "showed a more than expert craftsmaship than was to be found  in the last two episodes of the series. The acting was good and the setting was adequate."

The Canberra Times said "why is it that Australian playwrights seem to connect drama with crime, and that plays about suburbia are made to work with a stiff lacing of larceny, murder or prowlers? Now that these themes have been more than sufficiently covered in four of the five Monday night plays, we must keep our fingers crossed that a reasonable part of the remainder; will deal with problems and complications that the rest of the population are facing from day to day... The play... will do nothing for the reputations of Ed Devereaux or the others in the cast."

See also
 List of television plays broadcast on Australian Broadcasting Corporation (1960s)

References

External links
 
 
 

1966 television plays
1966 Australian television episodes
1960s Australian television plays
Australian Playhouse (season 1) episodes